Herb Morgan (October 16, 1943 – December 19, 2003) was an American politician. He served as a Democratic member for the 10th and 12th district of the Florida House of Representatives.

Life and career 
Morgan attended Florida State University.

In 1974, Morgan was elected to represent the 12th district of the Florida House of Representatives, succeeding Carroll Webb. He served until 1982, when he was succeeded by Wayne Hollingsworth. In the same year, he was elected to represent the 10th district, succeeding James Harold Thompson. He served until 1986, when he was succeeded by Hurley W. Rudd.

Morgan died in December 2003 of cancer, at the age of 60.

References 

1943 births
2003 deaths
Democratic Party members of the Florida House of Representatives
20th-century American politicians
Florida State University alumni
Deaths from cancer